Lee Alexander may refer to:

Lee Alexander (musician), American bassist, songwriter and music producer
Lee Alexander (politician) (1927–1996), mayor of Syracuse, New York for 16 years
Lee Gibson (née Alexander; born 1991), Scottish footballer

See also
Leigh Alexander (1898–1943), soldier
Leigh Alexander (journalist), journalist
Alexander (surname)